Michael Dunbar (30 October 1863 – 6 September 1921) was a Scottish footballer. He played for Cartvale, Cowlairs, Hibernian and Celtic as an inside right. After being forced to retire from playing football due to injury, Dunbar became a director of Celtic.

References

Sources

External links
London Hearts profile

1863 births
1921 deaths
Association football inside forwards
Scottish footballers
Scotland international footballers
Hibernian F.C. players
Celtic F.C. players
Cowlairs F.C. players
Footballers from Glasgow
Celtic F.C. non-playing staff
Place of death missing
Directors of football clubs in Scotland